USS Pluck (AMc-94) was an Accentor-class coastal minesweeper acquired by the U.S. Navy for the dangerous task of removing mines from minefields laid in the water to prevent ships from passing.

Pluck, a wooden-hulled coastal minesweeper, was laid down 7 June 1941 by the Noank Shipbuilding Co., Noank, Connecticut, launched 4 April 1942 and placed in service 6 October 1942, Lt. (j.g.) J. C. Butt, USNR, in charge.

World War II service 

Following shakedown and training, Pluck departed Miami, Florida, 19 February 1943, for San Juan, Puerto Rico. She soon operated from the American naval base at Trinidad, British West Indies. She conducted minesweeping operations in the Caribbean to protect Allied shipping.

Post-war inactivation 

Pluck was decommissioned 12 November 1945. She was struck from the Naval Vessel Register 8 May 1946. Transferred to the Maritime Commission 24 November 1947, she was subsequently sold.

References

External links 
 Dictionary of American Naval Fighting Ships
 NavSource Online: Mine Warfare Vessel Photo Archive - Pluck (AMc 94)

World War II minesweepers of the United States
Ships built in Groton, Connecticut
1942 ships